Krisztina Szremkó (born 6 January 1972 in Dunaújváros) is a female water polo player from Hungary, who competed for her native country at the 2004 Summer Olympics in Athens, Greece.

She played professional water polo for Dunaújváros, Eger, BVSC, Szentes, and Mediterrane. Szremkó's biggest success was winning the world title with the Hungary women's national team in 1994.

See also
 List of world champions in women's water polo
 List of World Aquatics Championships medalists in water polo

External links
 

1972 births
Living people
Sportspeople from Dunaújváros
Hungarian female water polo players
Olympic water polo players of Hungary
Water polo players at the 2004 Summer Olympics
Water polo players at the 2008 Summer Olympics
20th-century Hungarian women
21st-century Hungarian women